PT MNC Asia Holding Tbk, formerly known as PT MNC Investama Tbk and PT Bhakti Investama Tbk, doing business as MNC Asia Holding or MNC Group, is an Indonesian multinational conglomerate engaged in media, financial services, and entertainment hospitality based in Jakarta, Indonesia. It was established on 2 November 1989 as a financial security company. It holds a majority shareholding of MNC Media (formerly known as Bimantara Citra), MNC Financial Services (formerly known as Bhakti Kapital Indonesia), and MNC Land (formerly known as Kridaperdana Indahgraha and Global Land Development). It is said to be the largest media company in the country.

History
MNC Investama was established in Surabaya on 2 November 1989 by Hary Tanoesoedibjo as Bhakti Investama. The company initially focuses solely on capital-market related activities. It moved its headquarters to Jakarta in 1990. The Company's relocation to Jakarta brought greater opportunities to develop the business in line with the evolving capital market.

In 1994, the Company expanded the scope of its business to include securities trading and brokerage, investment advisory, investment manager, underwriter, origination and syndication, financial advisory and research services, as well as mergers and acquisitions, followed by the launch of mutual fund products. The trust demonstrated by the customers convinced the Company to list its stocks on the Jakarta Stock Exchange and the Surabaya Stock Exchange (now merged into the Indonesia Stock Exchange) through an initial public offering in 1997.

MNC Lido City 
MNC Lido City is one of the MNC Land projects being developed. It is located south of Bogor city, West Java, near the village Cigombong, i.e., near Cigombong railway station and the Cigombong toll gates of the Bocimi Toll Road.

The first phase is the development of the Trump International Resort & Golf Club Lido, a golf club and residences. 

A visit in 2019 by Donald Trump Jr. raised questions about the financial conflicts of interest between the Trump family and the presidency.

Directors and commissioners

List of President Directors

Board of Directors

Board of Commissioner

Shareholder 
The composition of MNC Corporation's shareholders as of June 30, 2022 are:

References

External links
 
MNC Corporation
Companies based in Jakarta
Conglomerate companies established in 1989
Conglomerate companies of Indonesia
Indonesian companies established in 1989
Holding companies established in 1989
Companies listed on the Indonesia Stock Exchange
1997 initial public offerings